Lala Tulpan ("Tulip in Bloom") in Ufa is one of Russia's largest mosques with 53-metre-tall twin minarets. The building can hold up to 1000 worshippers. It was built between 1990 and 1998 to a modernist design by Wakil Davlyatshin. In 2001 Vladimir Putin held a meeting with Talgat Tadzhuddin and other Muslim clerics at the mosque.

See also 
Islam in Russia
List of mosques in Russia
List of mosques in Europe

References 

Mosques in Ufa
Mosques completed in 1998
Mosques in Russia
Mosques in Europe